Gordonstown is a rural settlement close to Cornhill in the Banff and Buchan area of Aberdeenshire, Scotland.

Geography
Gordonstown is situated at the junction where the B9022 road to Portsoy leaves the A95 Keith to Banff road.

Education
Ordiquhill School is a primary school located within the settlement and serving the surrounding area.

References

External links

Gordonstown (Banff and Buchan) on Ordnance Survey GetOutside

Villages in Aberdeenshire